The Seattle Film Critics Society Award for Best Director is one of the annual awards given by the Seattle Film Critics Society.

Winners and nominees

† indicates the winner of the Academy Award for Best Director.

2010s

2020s

References

Awards for best director
Director